Zhai Gong (fl. 2nd century BCE) was a Magistrate under the Emperor Wen of the Han dynasty of China.

He was a native of Xiagui (下邽) in Shaanxi. He was a popular politician; yet when he was dismissed from his office, he was abandoned. Upon his reinstatement, his friends tried to come back; but he denied them, and posted a notice to the effect that true friendship endures even through poverty and disgrace.

References

2nd-century BC Chinese people